Psychedelic Speed Freaks is a live album by High Rise, released in 1984 through P.S.F. Records.

Track listing

Personnel 
Asahito Nanjo – vocals, bass guitar
Munehiro Narita – guitar
Shimizu – drums on "Stone Addict"
Ikuro Takahashi – drums

References 

1984 live albums
High Rise (band) albums
P.S.F. Records albums